Kayamkulam Kochunniyude Makan is an Indian Malayalam Television Series which aired on Surya TV and Streamed on Sun NXT from 12 December 2016 to 16 June 2017. It is sequel to 2004 TV series Kayamkulam Kochunni.

Plot 
Execution of the legendary thief Kayamkulam Kochunni know to have been a help and comfort to the poor. His son Sulthan grew up with his mind filled with revenge at he could not find an explanation for why his father who helped the poor was punished. Through his family moved away from his ancestral place, Sulthan plans to return.

Cast 
Titular character
 Askar Ameer as Sultan ; Son of Kayamkulam Kochunni
Lead Cast
 Shalu Kurian as Naseema
 Premi Viswanath as Thamara
 Recurring Cast
Suchithra Nair
Anju Aravind
 Anoop Chandran
 Hareesh Peradi
 Sreeraman
 Sasi Kalinga
 Mohanraj
Nila Raj
Idavela Babu
Anand Bharathi
Kumarakom Raghunath
V. K. Sreeraman
Sabitha Nair as Mathangi

References 

2016 Indian television series debuts
2017 Indian television series endings
Surya TV original programming
Malayalam-language television shows